Robert Neil "Bob" Wiseman (born 1962) is a film composer, songwriter, author and music teacher. Wiseman discovered or produced many artists including  Ron Sexsmith, The Lowest of the Low, Bruce McCulloch of Kids in the Hall, Anhai, and former Canadian member of parliament Andrew Cash. He is a founding member of Blue Rodeo with whom he won 5 Juno Awards.

Career
In the 1980s Wiseman played at open stages in Toronto where he started producing friends Bob Snider, Kyp Harness, Ron Sexsmith, Sahara Spracklin and Sam Larkin. He joined Blue Rodeo in 1984 and quit in 1992 to follow a solo career.

Wiseman's songs often incorporate new musical elements and explicit political  themes. Guest contributors on his 13 albums include Daniel Lanois, Mary Margaret O'Hara, Eugene Chadbourne, Edie Brickell, Ron Sexsmith, Jane Siberry, Basia Bulat and Serena Ryder.  In 2009 a 20th anniversary edition of In Her Dream was released by the Blocks Recording Club and the songs were performed live by various friends including RonSexsmith, Geoff Berner, Owen Pallett, Kyp Harness, The Phonemes, Picastro, Michael Holt, Maggie MacDonald, UIC, Henri Faberge, and Don Christensen. In 2006 Wiseman and his partner, Magali Meagher, were accompaniment for Daniel Johnston. Wiseman was also a member of Slutarded, Black Eyes, The Hidden Cameras and Dick Duck & the Dorks. Some of his better known songs include "White Dress" – a song about sexual assault, recorded by Serena Ryder, "What the Astronaut Noticed and Then Suggested" which was the theme song for the CBC Television series Material World, and "Maureen".

Touring and theatre
In 2009 Wiseman created Actionable, a PowerPoint presentation utilizing Super 8, video and live accompaniment on accordion and guitar which he presented in 2010 at the Uno Festival in Victoria as well as Fringe Festival circuits. Wiseman collaborated theatrically with Scott Thompson of The Kids in the Hall, creating and touring Scottastrophe also with Anand Rajaram on award-winning Cowboys and Indians  and with Sean Dixon for Barbara Gowdy's story The White Bone adaptation, with The Madawaska String Quartet and with Maggie MacDonald and Stephanie Markowitz writing the music for their play The Rat King.

Wiseman toured with Feist, Final Fantasy, Ron Sexsmith, and Scott Thompson and was a guest performer with Wilco, The Wallflowers, Eugene Chadbourne, Jimmy Carl Black (of Frank Zappa), Edie Brickell, Michelle Wright, Ashley MacIsaac & Garland Jeffries. Videos on YouTube of Wiseman songs performed with Feist ("You Don't Love Me"), Serena Ryder ("White Dress") Sexsmith ("All The Trees)".

Artists who covered Bob songs include The Madawaska String Quartet, UIC, Leah Abramson, The Bourbon Tabernacle Choir, Michael Holt, Change of Heart, Magali Meagher, Tom St. Louis, Ben Bootsma and The Blind Venetians.

Wiseman makes super 8 films and videos that he accompanies live on accordion, guitar or piano. He tours/ performs with these films in Europe, United States, New Zealand and Canada subtitling them when necessary. Wiseman is the only live musician on John Oswald's 1988 release Plunderphonics. He was on the board of directors for LIFT, TAIS, The Tranzac & the Blocks Recording Club label in Toronto. In 2019 he obtained his master's degree in Environmental Studies from York University and currently is in the PhD program at the International Institute for Critical Studies in Improvisation.

Production
Wiseman started producing records in the 1980s,  his debut "Wet Water" charted No. 4 on CKLN-FM at Ryerson University. Soon he was arranging and recording many friends like Ron Sexsmith, Sam Larkin, Kyp Harness, Sahara Spracklin and UIC. The record he produced for Ron Sexsmith "Grand Opera Lane" was rejected by Canadian A&R representatives. Through persistence he managed to get it to Todd Sullivan at Geffen Records in Los Angeles, who eventually gave it to Ronnie Vance in the publishing department which led to a deal for Ron Sexsmith with Interscope. Other notable clients were Kid in the Hall Bruce McCulloch, with whom Wiseman produced and co-wrote much of his Atlantic Records release Shame Based Man (listed as No. 24 on Spin Magazine's top comedy albums of all time). Other artists Wiseman has produced include Edie Brickell, Canadian Member of Parliament Andrew Cash, Knitting Factory Recording Artist Carmaig de Forest, Robert Priest, Anhai, Friendly Rich, Jess Reimer, Katie Crown, Bourbon Tabernacle Choir, Eugene Chadbourne, and Bob Snider.

Author Composer

June 2022, Improv notes Issue on Coleman Hughes goes to Washington. 
April 2022, Improv notes Issue on Freddie Stone Musical Phenomenologist. 
April 2021, Improv notes Issue on the Tranzac and Covid. 
July 2020, ECW Press Music Lessons 350 pages.

Film scores
 Coleslaw Warehouse (1994) by Bruce McCulloch
 American Whiskey Bar (1996) by Bruce McDonald
 Thirst (2000) by Jessica Joy Wise
 Toraanisqatsi (2001) by Leif Harmsen
 The Racist Brick (2003) by Dave Derewlany and Adam Brodie
 Scarlett's Room (2004) by Yvonne Ng
  Heart Mission (2005) by Katie Crown
  Abstract (2007) by Steve Whitehouse
  Drawing from Life (2008) by Katerina Cizek 
  Sous l'oeil du temps (2009) by Madi Pillar
  The Pickles Shane (2009) by Levi MacDougall
  That Thing That Happened (2010) by Josh Saltzman and Lindsay Ames 
  The Old Ways (2011) by Mike Vass 
  Sad Wet Happy Dry (2011) by Levi MacDougall
  Even If My Hands Were Full of Truths (2012) by Franci Duran
  The Thunder Bird & The Killer Whale (2012) by Caroline Trudell
  What's Art Got To Do With It? (2013) by Isabel Fryzsberg
  The Ghosts In Our Machine (2013) by Liz Marshall
  Candy (2013) by Cassandra Cronenberg
  David Noble: A Wrench In The Gears (2013) by Jon Bullick
  Safir (2013) by Mariam Zaidi
  Mugshot (2014) by Dennis Mohr
  Every Story Has a Twist (2014) by Bindu Shah
  Love Song for the Apocalypse (2014) by David Ridgen
  Micah Lexier, Visual Artist (2015) by Min Sook Lee
  Blood White (2015) by Rotter and Kess
  The Education of William Bowman (2015) by Ken Finkleman
  Political Refugee (2015) by Rob Stefaniuk
  Meat Pie (2015) by Eytan Millstone
  Idiots In Love (2016) by Kathleen Phillips-Locke
  The Drawer Boy (2017) by Arturo Pérez Torres and Aviva Armour-Ostroff
  Rasputin (2018) by Jamie Shannon
  Temperance (2022) by Scott Thompson

Television scores
 Material World (1992) for Canadian Broadcasting Corporation
 Wildside (1993–1994) for Nickelodeon
 Pet Project (1995–1998) for Animal Planet
 Spiritual Literacy (1998) for VisionTV
 Twitch City (1996–1999) Bruce McDonald (director) and Don McKellar
 Loving Spoonful (1998–2006) for WTN network & Canadian Broadcasting Corporation
 The Distractions (2003) for The Comedy Network
 Carolina Dai (2011) for RAI
 Guidance (2013) for BiteTV
 Derby (2016) for Bravo

Theatre scores
 Peter Cottontail (1969) directed by Mrs. Smith
 The 3 Penny Epic Cabaret (1994) directed by Adam Nashman
 Hys Unauthorized Lyfe and Tymes (2002) directed by Anand Rajaram
 The Rat King (2006) directed by Maggie MacDonald and Steph Markowitz
 The White Bone (2007) directed by Sean Dixon
 Cowboys and Indians (2008) directed by Anand Rajaram
 Actionable (2011) directed by Sean Dixon
 Smother (2012) directed by Omar Joseph Hady
 Charming Monsters (2013) directed by Aaron Rothermund

Radio scores
 Someone Knows Something (2016) produced by CBC

Production discography

Selected releases
 Bob Wiseman Sings Wrench Tuttle: In Her Dream (1989, Atlantic Records). The album created some notoriety when the first thousand copies were destroyed by Warner Music due to the song "Rock and Tree" which was feared libelous. It was about the murder of Salvador Allende and mentioned Richard Nixon, Henry Kissinger and Donald M. Kendall, the president of Pepsi Cola. "Wrench Tuttle", the credited lyricist, was a Wiseman pseudonym.  (Wiseman claimed that he set music to words by Tuttle, a poet who would send him lyrics in the mail.)  The album was included in the Canadian music critics top 100 albums of all time  The album yielded the video "We Got Time", with cameos by Mendelson Joe and friends, Tracy Wright (for whom Wiseman wrote the 2013 song mothface@yahoo.ca), Don McKellar, Leslie Spit Treeo and Mary Margaret O'Hara. The album also featured "Airplane on the Highway" which had an accompanying video by Caroline Azar and animator Lisa Bujoin.
 Hits of the 60s and the 70s (1990, self released) recording of piano improvisations that contained no hits from the 60s or70s.
 Presented by Lake Michigan Soda (1991, Warner Music Canada). Guests included Edie Brickell, Jane Siberry and Eugene Chadbourne with whom he recorded Chopin's etude Opus 10 No. 6 retitling it opus 10 No. 666 with Chadbourne on distorted electric rake introducing himself as "Oighan Chadbornitsky of the Budapest Philharmonic". The song "What the Astronaught Noticed and Then Suggested" became the theme song for the CBC Television sitcom Material World produced by The Kids in the Halls Susan Cavan. Three videos were filmed for PBLMS. "The Man From Glad" was directed by Yvonne Ng (artistic director of Princess Productions) shot by Nicholas de Pencier with costars including Keith Cole. "Frost in Florida", about global warming, was directed by Andrea Nann and shot by de Pencier. "Taylor Field",about adolescent suicide, was directed by Howard Wiseman.
 City of Wood (1993, Warner Music Canada and Glitterhouse Records in Europe)
 Beware of Bob (1994, Sabre Touque Records in Canada and FU Stephano in Italy) – instrumental album. 
 Accidentally Acquired Beliefs (1995, Warner Music Canada).  It was recorded at Metalworks Studios in Mississauga, Ontario.
 More Work Songs from the Planet of the Apes (1997, God Finds Cats). Jean Smith praised it for the song Libelous about activists David Morris and Helen Steel (see McLibel case).
 It's True (2004, Blocks Recording Club)
 Theme and Variations (2006, Blocks Recording Club). Top 10 of 2006 Toronto's Now Magazine.
 The Legend (2008, Blocks Recording Club), a live recording from Halifax.
 Giulietta Masina at the Oscars Crying (2013, Blocks Recording Club (vinyl), God Finds Cats (CD)). Songs about police murders, Robert Dziekanski taser incident, and political leaders. Guests include Mary Margaret O'Hara, Maylee Todd, Serena Ryder, Mark Hundevad, Michael Keith and Michael Holt.

Production
 Wiseman Sessions (1988) UIC
 Outside The Law (1989) Basic English
 Sam Larkin (1989) Sam Larkin
 Grand Opera Lane (1990) Ron Sexsmith
 Put Your Head on Your Shoulders (1990) The Bourbon Tabernacle Choir
 Nowhere Fast (1991) Kyp Harness
 You (1991) Bob Snider
 Love Song to the Alien (1992) The Liz Band
 Shaylee (1992) Edie Brickell
 Hi (1992) Andrew Cash
 Just Buy It (1992) Furnaceface
 Gamble/ Motel 6 (1993) Lowest of the Low
 Ruins of Our Own (1993) Eugene Chadbourne
 Shame-Based Man (1995) Bruce McCulloch
 California (1996) Jeanette Froncz
 Spacewoman (1998) Selina Martin
 We Need A New F Word (2005) Friendly Rich
 Gamma Knife (2011) Maria Kasstan
 Apology (2011) Eihpos Grapes
 Countdown (2011) Stacey McLeod
 Arachnia (2011) Sean Dixon
 New Boots (2011) Laska Sawade
 Catholic School (2011) Christine Cleary
 Love You More (2011) Kwesi Immanuel
 Three of Swords (2013) Mimi Osvath
 The Nightjar and The Garden (2014) Jess Reimer
 The Secret Songs of Sam Larkin (2015) Sam Larkin
 Tomorrow Is Today (2018) Anhai
 Love is Hard (2022)  Robert Priest

Solo discography
 Wet Water (1984)
 In Her Dream: Bob Wiseman Sings Wrench Tuttle (1989)
 Hits of the Sixties and Seventies (1990)
 Presented by Lake Michigan Soda (1991)
 City of Wood (1993)
 Beware of Bob (1994)
 Accidentally Acquired Beliefs (1995)
 More Work Songs from the Planet of the Apes (1997)
 It's True (2004)
 Theme and Variations (2006)
 The Legend (2008)
 In Her Dream (2009) – 20th anniversary edition on vinyl with previously unreleased tracks
 Giulietta Masina At The Oscars Crying (2013)

Film and videography
A retrospective of his films and videos were shown in 2010 both in Kuopio, Finland and in Genoa, Italy at the Associazione Culturale Disorderdrama.

 Alexander and the Hydro Pole (1999)
 All Dressed Up (2001)
 Bhopal (driftnet plan) (2003)
 My Cousin Dave (2003)
 Uranium (2004)
 Drum Sounds (2005)
 Bob And Choice (2006)with Scott Thompson, Levi MacDougall and Nathan Fielder
 Found Poetry (2006)
 100 Instruments (2007)
 Dead Inside (2007)
 Who Am I (2008)
 Ten Cent Job (2009)
 Response of a Lakota Woman to FBI Intimidation (2009)
 Disappearing Trick (2009)
 Hand Language (2010)
 You Don't Love Me (2010)
 Three Men (2011)
 Two (2011)
 Neil Young at the Junos (2013)
 Misery (2016)
 Mothface@Yahoo.ca (2017)
 The Reform Part at Burning Man (2019)

Personal life
Wiseman attended Joseph Wolinsky Collegiate, École River Heights, Grant Park, Argyle Alternative High School in Winnipeg, Manitoba and holds a Masters of Environmental Studies from York University. Currently a 2024 PhD candidate at the International Institute for Critical Studies in Improvisation.

Awards
 5 Juno Awards won with Blue Rodeo
 Juno nomination Most Promising Male Vocalist
 Gemini Award Nomination 2000 for Twitch City music
 Lifetime achievement award winner from CBC Radio 3
 Presented with the Key to Bruno, Saskatchewan by the Mayor in 2008
 Best Songwriter 2013 Now Readers Poll (runner up)
 2015 Dan Galea 4th Wiseman Music of Sound Award 
 2017 Favourite cover of Exclaim! 25th anniversary issue.

References

External links

1962 births
Living people
21st-century Canadian pianists
Alternative rock pianists
Blue Rodeo members
Canadian alternative rock musicians
Canadian country rock musicians
Canadian people of Lithuanian-Jewish descent
Canadian record producers
Canadian male singer-songwriters
Jewish Canadian musicians
Jewish Canadian writers
Musicians from Winnipeg
Psychedelic folk musicians
Writers from Winnipeg
Glitterhouse Records artists